The electoral history of Samuel J. Randall, member of the United States House of Representatives and Speaker of the House.

United States House of Representatives

Congressional elections
Pennsylvania's 1st congressional district, 1862:
 Samuel J. Randall (D) – 7,720 (55.17%)
 Edward G. Webb (R) – 6,273 (44.83%)

Pennsylvania's 1st congressional district, 1864:
 Samuel J. Randall (D) – 9,764 (55.78%)
 John M. Butler (NU) – 7,742 (44.23%)

Pennsylvania's 1st congressional district, 1866:
 Samuel J. Randall (D) – 12,192 (61.2%)
 Charles Gibbons (R) – 7,728 (38.80%)

Pennsylvania's 1st congressional district, 1868:
 Samuel J. Randall (D) – 14,745 (63.69%)
 Benjamin L. Berry (R) – 8,408 (36.32%)

Pennsylvania's 1st congressional district, 1870:
 Samuel J. Randall (D) – 10,853 (61.81%)
 Benjamin Huckell (R) – 6,705 (38.19%)

Pennsylvania's 1st congressional district, 1872:
 Samuel J. Randall (D) – 10,133 (53.39%)
 David F. Houston (R) – 8,845 (46.61%)

Pennsylvania's 3rd congressional district, 1874:
 Samuel J. Randall (D) – 9,703 (57.82%)
 David F. Houston (R) – 7,060 (42.07%)
 Benjamin L. Berry (I) – 19 (0.11%)

Pennsylvania's 3rd congressional district, 1876:
 Samuel J. Randall (D) – 11,651 (56.31%)
 Benjamin L. Berry (R) – 9,041 (43.69%)

Pennsylvania's 3rd congressional district, 1878:
 Samuel J. Randall (D) – 10,717 (57.35%)
 John Shedden (G) – 7,970 (42.65%)

Pennsylvania's 3rd congressional district, 1880:
 Samuel J. Randall (D) – 13,639 (57.79%)
 Benjamin L. Berry (R) – 9,912 (42.65%)
 DeWitt C. Davis (G) – 50 (0.21%)

Pennsylvania's 3rd congressional district, 1882:
 Samuel J. Randall (D) – 11,688 (61.55%)
 William M. Maull (R) – 7,302 (38.45%)

Pennsylvania's 3rd congressional district, 1884:
 Samuel J. Randall (D) – 12,340 (56.78%)
 Jacob J. Gumper (R) – 9,055 (42.32%)

Pennsylvania's 3rd congressional district, 1886:
 Samuel J. Randall (D) – 11,320 (95.32%)
 Frederick Halterman (P) – 217 (1.83%)
 Various independents – 339 (2.85%)

Pennsylvania's 3rd congressional district, 1888:
 Samuel J. Randall (D) – 17,642 (99.37%)
 Various independents – 112 (0.63%)

Speaker elections
1876 Speaker of the House election (Special):
 Samuel J. Randall (D–Pennsylvania) – 162
 James A. Garfield (R–Ohio) – 82
 Others – 3

1877 Speaker of the House election:
 Samuel J. Randall (D–Pennsylvania) – 149 (53.03%)
 James A. Garfield (R–Ohio) – 132 (46.98%)

1879 Speaker of the House election:
 Samuel J. Randall (D–Pennsylvania) – 144
 James A. Garfield (R–Ohio) – 125
 Others – 14

References

Sources
 

Randall, Samuel J.